Working Beks is a 2016 Philippine comedy drama film written and directed by Chris Martinez. It stars John Lapus, TJ Trinidad, Edgar Allan Guzman, Joey Paras and Prince Stefan. The film is about five gay men from different walks of life are confronted with important choices that could change everything for them.

Plot
The story revolves around a day in their intertwined lives wherein each has to make a crucial decision that can change the course of their career, love life, health, finances, and destiny.

Tommy (TJ Trinidad) is a respected Marketing Director up for a promotion as Senior VP.  He is well-loved in the office, and at home, he leads a healthy family life with his longtime partner and their two teenage daughters.  But to his and everybody’s surprise, his most coveted position is no longer his for the taking.  Now, Tommy is about to raise hell.

If there’s anyone else entitled to raise some hell, that would be Gorgeous (John Lapus).  Already the  breadwinner of his family, his mother even asks him to extend financial help to their relatives.  Worse, when his estranged and abusive father returns, his mother readily welcomes him back.  The only way Gorgeous escapes his harsh reality is “fangirling” over the matinee idol, Champ.

Rumors have it that Champ (Edgar Allan Guzman) is gay, especially after a kissing video of him and another man circulated in the internet.  He’s been in hiding for days, but luckily, his mother is there to support him.  Now, he finally agrees to an interview on primetime TV.  Will he be completely honest, considering that his career and multi-million product endorsements are at stake?

Meanwhile, one of those affected by Champ’s video scandal is Mandy (Joey Paras).  It is his wedding day, but he is having cold feet as his sexual desires for men have been reawakened.  Mandy’s fiancée seems to understand, but urges him to contemplate if his life would be complete without her. 

Another one experiencing an anxiety attack is Jet (Prince Stefan), the promiscuous call center agent who learns that the guy he recently hooked up with committed suicide because he had HIV.  It’s about time Jet gets himself tested for sexually transmitted disease, but the memories of his recklessness are already killing him.

Cast
 John Lapus as Gorgeous
 TJ Trinidad as Tommy
 Joey Paras as Mandy
 Edgar Allan Guzman as Champ
 Prince Stefan as Jet
 Bela Padilla as Joy
 Marlon Rivera as HMQ
 Ricci Chan as Annabelle
 Raquel Villavicencio as Mommy Pearl
 Leo Martinez as Mr. Ted
 Arnold Reyes as George
 Johnny Revilla as Orly
 Tess Antonio as Lorna
 Jeric Raval as Gardo
 Patricia Ismael as Annie
 Madeleine Nicolas as Glo
 Rez Cortez as Gusting
 Cai Cortez as Judith
 Geraldine Villamil as Nurse Betty
 Atak as Brother Benj
 Lao Rodriguez as Champ's Stylist
 Kiki Baento as Jet's Supervisor
 Andres Vasquez as Jonjon
 Jelson Bay as Talkshow Host 1
 Ana Abad Santos as Talkshow Host 2
 Dennis Marasigan as Priest
 Hailey Lim as Nicole
 Elijah Alejo as Sasa
 Ianne Oandasan as Jeannie
 Franco Nerona as Hershey
 Ejay Fontanilla as Glamteam
 Brilliant Juan as Glamteam
 Jhunee Alfonso as Glamteam
 Christian Canales as Nurse

Release
The film was released on November 23, 2016.

Reception
Philbert Dy of ClickTheCity gave the film negative reviews and wrote: 

Oggz Cruz of Rappler gave the film a positive review and he wrote:

Soundtrack
 We're the Beks
Composed by Thyro Alfaro
Produced by Civ Fontanilla
Arranged by Thyro Alfaro
Performed by John Lapus, TJ Trinidad, Joey Paras, Edgar Allan Guzman, and Prince Stefan

References

External links
  

2016 LGBT-related films
Philippine LGBT-related films
2016 comedy-drama films
Films directed by Chris Martinez
Gay-related films